The Bahlueț (also: Bahluieț) is a right tributary of the river Bahlui in Romania. It discharges into the Bahlui in Podu Iloaiei.

Tributaries
The following rivers are tributaries to the river Bahlueț (from source to mouth):
Left: Pășcănia, Probota, Cucuteni, Valea Oii
Right: Rediu, Ciunca, Albești, Sinești, Hărpășești

References

Rivers of Romania
Rivers of Iași County